The Technical College, Basrah was established in 1994 in Basrah southern Iraq, belongs to Iraqi Foundation of Technical Education. It is currently part of Southern Technical University.

Faculties 
The college consists of five faculties:
Faculty of Energy and Fuel Techniques
Faculty of Petrochemical Techniques
Faculty of Electrical Power Techniques
Faculty of Refrigeration and Air Conditioning Techniques
Faculty of Environment and Pollution

See also
List of Iraqi technical colleges and institutes
Iran

References

Basra
Schools in Iraq
1994 establishments in Iraq
Educational institutions established in 1994